Ali "Alain" Brakchi (26 February 1934 – 15 January 2021) was a track and field athlete from France, who was born in Sidi Aïch, Algeria. He mainly competed in the men's long jump. He represented France at the 1960 Summer Olympics in Rome, Italy.

He won a gold medal in the long jump for Algeria at the 1963 GANEFO.

References

1934 births
2021 deaths
Algerian male long jumpers
French male long jumpers
Olympic athletes of France
Athletes (track and field) at the 1960 Summer Olympics
People from Sidi-Aïch
Mediterranean Games gold medalists for France
Athletes (track and field) at the 1959 Mediterranean Games
Universiade medalists in athletics (track and field)
Mediterranean Games medalists in athletics
Universiade bronze medalists for France
French male sprinters
Medalists at the 1959 Summer Universiade
21st-century Algerian people